Isaac de Benserade (baptized 5 November 161310 October 1691) was a French poet.

Born in Lyons-la-Forêt, Normandy, his family appears to have been connected with Richelieu, who bestowed on him a pension of 600 livres. He began his literary career with the tragedy of Cléopâtre (1635), which was followed by four other pieces. On Richelieu's death, Benserade lost his pension but became more and more a favourite at court, especially with Anne of Austria.

Benserade provided the words for the court ballets and was in 1674 admitted to the French Academy, where he wielded considerable influence. In 1675, he provided the quatrains to accompany the 39 hydraulic sculpture groups depicting Aesop's fables in the labyrinth of Versailles. In 1676, the failure of his Métamorphoses d'Ovide in the form of rondeaux gave a blow to his reputation but by no means destroyed his vogue with his contemporaries. Benserade may be best known for his sonnet on Job (1651). The sonnet, which he sent to a young lady with his paraphrase on Job, was placed in competition with the Urania of Voiture and led to a dispute on their relative merits that long divided the whole court and the wits into two parties, styled respectively the Jobelins and the Uranists. The partisans of Benserade were headed by the prince de Conti and Mlle de Scudéry, and Mme de Montausier and Jean-Louis Guez de Balzac took the side of Voiture.

Some years before his death, Benserade retired to Gentilly and devoted himself to a translation of the Psalms, which he nearly completed.

Works 

 1636 Cléopâtre
 1637 La Mort d’Achille et la Dispute de ses armes
 1637 Gustaphe ou l’Heureuse Ambition
 1637 Iphis et Iante
 1640 Méléagre
 1648 Le Sonnet de Job
 1651 Ballet de Cassandre
 1651 Ballet des Fêtes de Bacchus
 1653 Ballet de la Nuit
 1654 Ballet des Proverbes
 1654 Ballet des Noces de Pélée et de Thétis
 1654 Ballet du Temps
 1655 Ballet des Plaisirs
 1655 Grand Ballet des Bienvenus
 1656 Ballet de Psyché
 1657 Ballet de l’Amour malade
 1658 Ballet royal d’Alcidiane
 1659 Ballet de la Raillerie
 1661 Ballet royal de l’Impatience
 1661 Ballet des Saisons
 1663 Ballet des Arts
 1664 Ballet des Amours déguisés
 1664 Les Plaisirs de l'île enchantée
 1665 Ballet royal de la Naissance de Vénus
 1666 Ballet des Muses
 1669 Ballet royal de Flore
 1676 Métamorphoses d’Ovide en rondeaux
 1678 Fables d'Ésope en quatrains
 1681 Ballet du Triomphe de l’Amour
 1682 Labyrinte de Versailles
 Stances

References

External links

 

1613 births
1691 deaths
People from Eure
Members of the Académie Française
17th-century French poets
17th-century French male writers
17th-century French dramatists and playwrights